Wolfgang Schilling may refer to:

 Wolfgang Schilling (footballer, born 1955) (1955–2018), German footballer
 Wolfgang Schilling (footballer, born 1957), German footballer